Apollinarius served as Greek Patriarch of Alexandria between 551 and 569. Before his appointment by Justinian I, he was a reader of the monastery of Salama.

Notes

Sources

6th-century Patriarchs of Alexandria